Malimbus is a genus of birds in the family Ploceidae. It was erected by the French ornithologist Louis Jean Pierre Vieillot in 1805.

The genus contains the following ten species:

References

 
Ploceidae
Taxa named by Louis Jean Pierre Vieillot
Taxonomy articles created by Polbot